Vídeo Brinquedo (also known as Toyland Video or Toy Video in English, formerly known as Spot Films) is a Brazilian animation studio, located in São Paulo, known for producing animated films widely viewed as cheap mockbusters of comparable, more successful films from studios such as Walt Disney Pictures, Pixar Animation Studios, DreamWorks Animation, 20th Century Fox and Blue Sky Studios. The company was founded in 1995 as a Brazilian subsidiary of American distributor Spot Films, to distribute animation with the intention of distribution in its home market of Brazil, then seemingly split up and became Vídeo Brinquedo in 2004 later on in 2006 they expanded to North America with the falling costs of DVD duplication and packaging, and easier access to language translation services. Most of Brinquedo's films are still available on DVD and streaming services, though it is unclear on whose owners of the studio's output currently are.

Background
For the first nine years, Vídeo Brinquedo distributed Portuguese-dubbed home video releases of shows such as Sonic X and The Little Lulu Show in the Brazilian market.

One of the studio's early distributions was an obscure religious-themed cartoon called Kingdom Under the Sea title sold only a few copies until the release of the 2003 Pixar film Finding Nemo. Kingdom Under the Sea and Finding Nemo had several similarities, such as the presence of a clownfish and a story centered on parent-child relationship. From the huge number of sales the company had on the cartoon, Brinquedo wanted to start not only distributing cartoons but also create their own.

Brinquedo's first animations were traditional and in 2D, based on public domain fairy tales and classics such as Pinocchio and the Three Little Pigs, but with scripts that modernized the characters. They later expanded to 3D animation, their first title being The Little Cars, loosely based on the 2006 Pixar animated film Cars. Originally aimed at children between two and three years old, the film sold over a million copies in its first month in Brazil, as well as selling over 5,000 copies per week in the United States at stores like Walmart.

The original idea of the company was to jump on trends raised by the major studios, and start production of animation with two to three years in advance. With the company borrowing ideas established in Hollywood, company director Mauricio Milani stated "we tried to imagine what it will be in advance". The films are often only just over 40 minutes in length, the minimum required to qualify as a feature film and awards qualification. Their films' English-dubbed casts (such as The Little Panda Fighter) also featured notable voice actors from 4Kids Entertainment and several Sonic the Hedgehog video games (in the 2000's).

Originally released with a Brazilian Portuguese soundtrack, many of Vídeo Brinquedo's titles were co-produced with Rexmore Company in Brazil, and distributed in North America by Branscome International, MorningStar Entertainment with English and Spanish soundtracks, Brightspark Productions in the United Kingdom, and Janson Media on Amazon Prime Video.

In the United States, the company exploited its low costs to distribute its discs through video rental outlets, along with rental kiosks such as Redbox. Usually, it timed its releases to a major movie release either in theaters or their home video debut, often acting as a "last resort" choice for harried parents or children who saw Brinquedo's look-alike covers and confused them with Hollywood film releases, or the latter were sold out, leaving a parent to rent it to avoid disappointment from their children.

Filmography

Film distribution 
Besides producing its own animated movies, Vídeo Brinquedo has also distributed DVDs of foreign cartoons like Sonic X, The Adventures of Super Mario Bros. 3, Little Lulu, Batfink, and a number of lesser-known fairy tale films made by Video Treasures (now Anchor Bay Entertainment). However, one of its most controversial distributions is Mega Powers!, which bears a close resemblance to the series Power Rangers and Super Sentai, but was not produced by Vídeo Brinquedo themselves. The series is a production of Intervalo Produções.

Reception
Vídeo Brinquedo's animated films have been heavily criticized for how they copy other mainstream animated films, as well as for their very poor animation, voice acting and questionable writing, alongside scenes which merely exist as "filler" so the films' runtime can qualify as "feature length". Erik Henriksen, a reporter from The Portland Mercury, criticized Vídeo Brinquedo as being "the laziest/cheapest movie studio of all time," due to similarities between its releases and the films of other animation studios, such as Pixar.

Marco Aurélio Canônico of Folha de S. Paulo, who criticized the Little Cars series as a copy of the Pixar film Cars, and likewise Ratatoing and Ratatouille, discussed whether lawsuits from Pixar would appear. The Brazilian Ministry of Culture posted Marco Aurélio Canônico's article on its website. Virgin Media also stated, "even by the ocean-floor-scraping standards of Vídeo Brinquedo, it's a shameless knock-off". 

The company also seems to depict racist tropes in their movies, such as in their infamous 2009 film  What's Up: Balloon to the Rescue, where stereotypes of Chinese and French culture are seen.

Disney's legal department was contacted by a reporter through a spokesperson about a potential lawsuit, but Milani did not comment.

In other media
Two of Vídeo Brinquedo's productions were parodied in an episode of The Amazing World of Gumball called "The Treasure", in which Gumball picks up a mockbuster DVD called How to Ratatwang Your Panda, a poorly rendered CGI film where a panda farts in front of several rats. The film parodies both The Little Panda Fighter and Ratatoing, which themselves are spoofed off of Kung Fu Panda and Ratatouille, albeit with no spoken dialogue.

See also 

 Mockbuster
 The Asylum, another studio notable for mockbusters
 Jetlag Productions

References

External links
  
 Blogspot page (in Portuguese)

Film production companies of Brazil
Brazilian animation studios
Companies based in São Paulo
1995 establishments in Brazil
Mass media companies established in 1995